The National Etruscan Museum is a museum of the Etruscan civilization, housed in the Villa Giulia in Rome, Italy.

History
The villa was built for Pope Julius III, for whom it was named. It remained in papal property until 1870, when, in the wake of the Risorgimento and the demise of the Papal States, it became the property of the Kingdom of Italy. The museum was founded in 1889 as part of the same nationalistic movement, with the aim of collecting together all the pre-Roman antiquities of Latium, southern Etruria and Umbria belonging to the Etruscan and Faliscan civilizations, and has been housed in the villa since the beginning of the 20th century.

Collections

The museum's most famous single treasure is the terracotta funerary monument, the almost life-size Bride and Groom (the so-called Sarcofago degli Sposi, or Sarcophagus of the Spouses), reclining as if they were at a dinner party.

Other objects held are:

 The Etruscan-Phoenician Pyrgi Tablets
 The Apollo of Veii
 The Cista Ficoroni
 A reconstructed frieze displaying Tydeus eating the brain of his enemy Melanippus
 The Tita Vendia vase
 The Sarpedon Krater (or, the "Euphronios Krater") - this is now at the Archaeological Museum of Cerveteri, it was at the Villa Giulia from 2008 to 2014
 The Centaur of Vulci
 Phoenician metal bowls

See also
Tarquinia National Museum

References

External links
 Museo Nazionale Etrusco information 
 

 
1889 establishments in Italy
Archaeological museums in Italy
Art museums and galleries in Rome
Museums established in 1889
National museums of Italy
Rome Q. III Pinciano